Daniel Strauch (born January 8, 1981) is a former German professional basketball player. Strauch mainly played as power forward.

Professional career
Strauch spent the majority of his pro career with EWE Baskets Oldenburg. His jersey number 6 was retired by the club from Oldenburg.

References

1981 births
Living people
German men's basketball players
EWE Baskets Oldenburg players
Power forwards (basketball)
Artland Dragons players
Sportspeople from Osnabrück